Ribeirão Bonito is a municipality in the state of São Paulo in Brazil. The population is 13,299 (2020 est.) in an area of 472 km2. The elevation is 590 m.

References

Municipalities in São Paulo (state)